Greg Healy (born 16 September 1965) is a former Australian rules footballer who played for Melbourne in the VFL/AFL. His brother Gerard was a Brownlow Medallist.

"Sugar" Healy's rise to the senior ranks at Melbourne were helped when he won the 1983 Morrish Medal for the season's best player in the VFL's Under-19 competition. A rover, he made his debut for the Demons the following season and in 1986 won their best and fairest award and topped their goalkicking. In 1988 he was appointed Melbourne's youngest ever captain at just 22 years of age. In his first year in charge he led the club to their first Grand Final since 1964, but they were defeated by Hawthorn.

Healy gave up the captaincy to Garry Lyon at the end of 1990. He suffered a season ending knee injury in round 3 against St Kilda in 1991 which resulted in a knee reconstruction. Healy returned and played on for the next two years, spending the majority of 1993 in the reserves, where he was part of the reserves 1993 premiership. He was delisted at the end of the 1993 season and was left unselected in the 1993 AFL Draft.

Playing statistics

|- style="background-color: #EAEAEA"
! scope="row" style="text-align:center" | 1984
|style="text-align:center;"|
| 33 || 16 || 25 || 24 || 230 || 63 || 293 || 63 ||  || 1.6 || 1.5 || 14.4 || 3.9 || 18.3 || 3.9 || 
|-
! scope="row" style="text-align:center" | 1985
|style="text-align:center;"|
| 33 || 7 || 7 || 5 || 83 || 27 || 110 || 32 ||  || 1.0 || 0.7 || 11.9 || 3.9 || 15.7 || 4.6 || 
|- style="background:#eaeaea;"
! scope="row" style="text-align:center" | 1986
|style="text-align:center;"|
| 33 || 17 || 35 || 24 || 290 || 106 || 396 || 68 ||  || 2.1 || 1.4 || 17.1 || 6.2 || 23.3 || 4.0 || 
|-
! scope="row" style="text-align:center" | 1987
|style="text-align:center;"|
| 33 || 23 || 29 || 27 || 347 || 181 || 528 || 90 || 41 || 1.3 || 1.2 || 15.1 || 7.9 || 23.0 || 3.9 || 1.8
|- style="background:#eaeaea;"
! scope="row" style="text-align:center" | 1988
|style="text-align:center;"|
| 33 || 22 || 13 || 16 || 318 || 157 || 475 || 81 || 36 || 0.6 || 0.7 || 14.5 || 7.1 || 21.6 || 3.7 || 1.6
|-
! scope="row" style="text-align:center" | 1989
|style="text-align:center;"|
| 33 || 21 || 24 || 22 || 311 || 177 || 488 || 90 || 29 || 1.1 || 1.1 || 14.8 || 8.4 || 23.2 || 4.3 || 1.4
|- style="background:#eaeaea;"
! scope="row" style="text-align:center" | 1990
|style="text-align:center;"|
| 33 || 13 || 11 || 7 || 162 || 104 || 266 || 46 || 14 || 0.8 || 0.5 || 12.5 || 8.0 || 20.5 || 3.5 || 1.1
|-
! scope="row" style="text-align:center" | 1991
|style="text-align:center;"|
| 33 || 3 || 4 || 7 || 47 || 12 || 59 || 9 || 0 || 1.3 || 2.3 || 15.7 || 4.0 || 19.7 || 3.0 || 0.0
|- style="background:#eaeaea;"
! scope="row" style="text-align:center" | 1992
|style="text-align:center;"|
| 33 || 11 || 9 || 7 || 119 || 89 || 208 || 40 || 10 || 0.8 || 0.6 || 10.8 || 8.1 || 18.9 || 3.6 || 0.9
|-
! scope="row" style="text-align:center" | 1993
|style="text-align:center;"|
| 33 || 8 || 10 || 7 || 69 || 64 || 133 || 20 || 6 || 1.3 || 0.9 || 8.6 || 8.0 || 16.6 || 2.5 || 0.8
|- class="sortbottom"
! colspan=3| Career
! 141
! 167
! 146
! 1976
! 980
! 2956
! 539
! 136
! 1.2
! 1.0
! 14.0
! 7.0
! 21.0
! 3.8
! 1.3
|}

References

External links

1965 births
Living people
Australian rules footballers from Victoria (Australia)
Melbourne Football Club players
Keith 'Bluey' Truscott Trophy winners
Melbourne Football Club captains